Caspar Springer (born 24 January 1937) is a Barbadian sprinter. He competed in the men's 400 metres at the 1972 Summer Olympics.

References

1937 births
Living people
Athletes (track and field) at the 1963 Pan American Games
Athletes (track and field) at the 1972 Summer Olympics
Barbadian male sprinters
Olympic athletes of Barbados
Place of birth missing (living people)
Pan American Games competitors for Barbados